The recency illusion is the belief or impression that a word or language usage is of recent origin when it is long-established. The term was coined by Arnold Zwicky, a linguist at Stanford University primarily interested in examples involving words, meanings, phrases, and grammatical constructions. However, use of the term is not restricted to linguistic phenomena: Zwicky has defined it simply as, "the belief that things you have noticed only recently are in fact recent".

According to Zwicky, the illusion is caused by selective attention.

Examples

Linguistic items prone to the recency illusion include:
 "Singular they": the use of "they," "them," or "their" to reference a singular antecedent without specific gender, as in "If George or Sally come by, give them the package." Although this usage is often cited as a modern invention, it is quite old.
 The phrase "between you and I" (rather than "between you and me"), often viewed today as a hypercorrection, which could also be found occasionally in Early Modern English.
 The intensifier "really," as in "it was a really wonderful experience," and the moderating adverb "pretty," as in "it was a pretty exciting experience." Many people have the impression that these usages are somewhat slang-like, and have developed relatively recently. They go back to at least the 18th century, and are commonly found in the works and letters of such writers as Benjamin Franklin.
 "Literally" being used figuratively as an intensifier is often viewed as a recent change, but in fact usage dates back to the 1760s.
 "Aks" as a production of African American English only. Use of "aks" in place of "ask" dates back to the works of Chaucer in Middle English, though typically in this context spelled "ax".
 The word "recency" itself. It is commonly used in consumer marketing ("analyze the recency of customer visits") and many think it was coined for that purpose. But its first known use was in 1612.

See also
 Frequency illusion

Notes
A.  Merriam Webster's Dictionary of English Usage noted, "Although the lack of a common-gender third person pronoun has received much attention in recent years from those concerned with women's issues, the problem, as felt by writers, is much older" (1989, page 901).

References

Further reading 
 

Historical linguistics